The Badak gas field is a natural gas field located in the South China Sea. It was discovered in 1970 and developed by and Pertamina. It began production in 1971 and produces natural gas and condensates. The total proven reserves of the Badak gas field are around 7 trillion cubic feet (200×109m³), and production is slated to be around 500 million cubic feet/day (14.2×105m³).

References

Natural gas fields in Indonesia